The 1944 Commonwealth Prime Ministers' Conference was the first Meeting of the Heads of Government of the British Commonwealth. It was held in the United Kingdom, between 1–16 May 1944, and was hosted by that country's Prime Minister, Winston Churchill.

The conference

Outline
The conference was attended by the Prime Ministers of all of the Dominions within the Commonwealth except Ireland and Newfoundland.  Attendees included Prime Minister John Curtin of Australia, Prime Minister William Lyon Mackenzie King of Canada, Prime Minister Peter Fraser of New Zealand and Prime Minister Jan Smuts of South Africa.  Also attending was Prime Minister Sir Godfrey Huggins of the self-governing colony of Southern Rhodesia, and representing India was The Maharaja of Jammu and Kashmir. Members of the Churchill War Cabinet and the High Commissioners of the Dominions also attended.

Ireland did not participate although at the time the British Commonwealth still regarded Ireland as one of its members. Ireland had not participated in any equivalent conferences since 1932.

The British Commonwealth leaders agreed to support the Moscow Declaration and reached agreement regarding their respective roles in the overall Allied war effort.

Prior to the conference, Robert McIntyre and Douglas Young, the leaders of the Scottish National Party, lobbied King, Fraser, Smuts, Huggins, and Curtin, asking them to raise the issue of Scottish independence at the conference and to invite Scotland to take part in it and all future Commonwealth Conferences. Curtin viewed it as an internal matter for the British government, King was sympathetic, and the remainder simply voiced their acknowledgement of the communiques.

Participants

Ministers

Military

 AUS General Sir Thomas Blamey
 UK Lieutenant-general Sir Hastings Ismay
 NZL Lieutenant-general Edward Puttick

Diplomats and civil servants
 AUS Sir Frederick Shedden Secretary, Department of Defence
 CAN Norman Robertson
 UK Sir John Stephenson 
 UK Sir Richard Hopkins Permanent Secretary to the Treasury

See also 
 List of Allied World War II conferences

References

1949
Diplomatic conferences in the United Kingdom
20th-century diplomatic conferences
1944 in international relations
1944 in London
United Kingdom and the Commonwealth of Nations
1944 conferences
World War II conferences
British Empire in World War II
United Kingdom in World War II
May 1944 events
Anthony Eden
Winston Churchill
Clement Attlee
William Lyon Mackenzie King
Jan Smuts